Charles of Habsburg may refer to:

 Charles V, Holy Roman Emperor (1516–1556)
 Charles II of Austria (1564–1590)
 Charles II of Spain (1665–1700)
 Charles VI, Holy Roman Emperor (1711–1740)
 Charles I of Austria (1916–1918)